designclue was a global, online, crowdsourcing platform, founded by PurpleCow Inc. established in 2012 and closed in 2017. In the website, companies / organizations / individuals created custom "Contest" to find independent freelance creators and purchase their creatives.
Independent contractors (mostly designers) created online profiles and portfolios, submit proposals to each contests, and collaborate and receive payment through the designclue website.

Background
2011 / Dec - Won the 1st prize in Japanese incubation contest "Startup Challenge 5th" and funded US$30,000.
2012 / Jun - PurpleCow Inc. has been Established in Shibuya, Tokyo, Japan.
2012 / Sep - Launched closed beta version of "designclue", the crowdsourcing service specializing in Designers.
2012 / Nov - Moved the office to Yanagibuild (Roppongi).
2013 / Feb - Funded 147,000 US$ by Incubate Fund and East Ventures.

2013 / Mar - Aligned with STORES.jp, an easy online EC store platform, and started producing online shop logo for free.

2013 / Apr - Aligned with Frekul,  a free music distribution SNS[5], and started artist-friendly designs productions.

2013 / Jun - Moved the office to Roppongi build.
2017 / Company closed.

In 2013, designclue was used by users from 65 countries including Japanese.

Other sites that provide similar services are Freelancer, DesignContest, Talenthouse.

Awards and recognition
designclue was awarded in one of the biggest Japanese Tech conference "IVS 2012".

See also
 Freelance marketplace
 Crowdsourcing
 Kolabtree

References

External links 
 

Online marketplaces of Japan
Freelance marketplace websites